The 1978 NCAA Men's Division I Swimming and Diving Championships were contested in March 1978 at the Belmont Plaza Pool at California State University, Long Beach in Long Beach, California at the 55th annual NCAA-sanctioned swim meet to determine the team and individual national champions of Division I men's collegiate swimming and diving in the United States. 

Tennessee topped the team standings for the first time, the Volunteers' first title in program history.

Team standings
Note: Top 10 only
(H) = Hosts
(DC) = Defending champions
Full results

See also
List of college swimming and diving teams

References

NCAA Division I Men's Swimming and Diving Championships
NCAA Division I Swimming And Diving Championships
NCAA Division I Swimming And Diving Championships